Marie Anne "Marian" van der Meer (18 May 1936 – 6 May 2022) was a Dutch politician. A member of the Labour Party, she served in the Senate from 1983 to 1995. She died in Amsterdam on 6 May 2022 at the age of 85.

References

1936 births
2022 deaths
20th-century Dutch women politicians
Members of the Senate (Netherlands)
Members of the Provincial Council of North Holland
Labour Party (Netherlands) politicians
People from Hengelo
20th-century Dutch politicians